Cavendish Mill is a Grade II* listed former cotton spinning mill in Ashton-under-Lyne, Greater Manchester, in the United Kingdom. It was built between 1884 and 1885 for the Cavendish Spinning Company by Potts, Pickup & Dixon of Oldham. Cavendish Mill was next to the Ashton Canal Warehouse at Portland Basin. It ceased spinning cotton in 1934 and was then used for a variety of purposes before it was converted into housing in 1994.

Location 
Cavendish mill was built on the site of the former Bankfield Mill, separated from Portland Basin on the final section of the Ashton Canal by the site of Tudor Mill,

History 
The Cavendish Spinning Company Limited was registered in 1884 to build the Cavendish Mill on the site of the former  Bankfield Mill. This was a Potts building. It was six storeys high  on the canal side, and five on the other. It is a fireproof design and was the first mill in Ashton to have concrete floors and a flat roof. It is instantly  recognisable by the octagonal staircase that surrounds the lower part of the chimney. It stopped spinning in 1934 and was put to other uses. It still stands.

Power 

The steam engine was a horizontal twin compound by Hick, Hargreaves & Co of Bolton.

Equipment 
The  machinery was provided by Asa Lees; originally there were 72,360 for coarse and medium counts. Between 1911 and 1920 many of the mules were replaced by ring frames so it contained 57,172 mule spindles and 22,588 ring spindles

Usage
Until 1934, the Cavendish Spinning Company used the mill for spinning coarse and mediums of American cotton, after which it was used for the process of winding artificial silk from synthetic fibres on to weavers beams by the Bentinck Street Silk Works company until 1976, and then by Twinglass Limited, a double glazing company, to manufacture window frames. It is still standing, having been converted into a resource centre for the community, commercial units and 165 apartments by the Worcester-based Sanctuary Housing Association in 1994. In June 2008 ownership passed to New Charter Housing Trust, a company specialising in managing social housing in Tameside. Among the commercial tenants is Tameside Community Radio Limited.

Owners
 Cavendish Spinning Company Ltd 
 Bentinck Street Silk Works Ltd, rayon processors 
 Twinglass Limited, a manufacturer of double glazed window frames
 Sanctuary Housing Association
 New Charter Housing Trust

See also 

Listed buildings in Ashton-under-Lyne
Textile manufacturing
Cotton Mill
Stott

References

Bibliography

External links

 www.cottontown.org
 www.spinningtheweb.org.uk

Textile mills in Tameside
Buildings and structures in Ashton-under-Lyne
Grade II* listed buildings in Greater Manchester